The John W. Kluge Prize for the Study of Humanity is awarded since 2003 for lifetime achievement in the humanities and social sciences to celebrate the importance of the Intellectual Arts for the public interest.

Overview

The prize is awarded by the John W. Kluge Center at the Library of Congress.  The Prize is conferred in a ceremony in the Great Hall of the Jefferson Building, attended by American political leaders to dramatize America's commitment to these areas of human inquiry. The Prize winner will give an address, will remain in residence at the Library of Congress for a short time thereafter, and will be expected to have some informal interaction with Members of the United States Congress.

Members of the Scholars' Council, as described in the appended Charter of the John W. Kluge Center, and holders of the Kluge Chairs will be among those offering recommendations to the Librarian of Congress concerning recipients of the Kluge Prize.

Endowed by Library benefactor John W. Kluge, the Kluge Prize rewards lifetime achievement in the wide range of disciplines not covered by the Nobel Prizes. Such disciplines include history, philosophy, politics, anthropology, sociology, religion, criticism in the arts and humanities, and linguistics. The award is at the financial level of the Nobel awards.

The prize is international; the recipient may be of any nationality, writing in any language. The main criterion for a recipient of the Kluge Prize is deep intellectual accomplishment in the human sciences. The recipient's body of work should evidence growth in maturity and range over the years. The recipient will have demonstrated unusual distinction within a given area of inquiry and across disciplines in the human sciences. Significantly, the recipient's writings should be, in large part, understandable and important for those involved in public affairs.

Candidates

In order to ensure consideration of as wide a pool of candidates as possible, in 2001, the Librarian of Congress solicited nominations for the Kluge Prize from a broad range of individuals knowledgeable about the humanities and social sciences in colleges, universities, and research institutions across the globe, as well as from independent scholars and writers.

In 2002, the Librarian of the Library of Congress called upon a Scholars' Council of 20 preeminent scholars from around the world to consider the range of nominations. The council had been established to offer suggestions and advice on the choice of scholars to study at the John W. Kluge Center at the Library.

Based upon extensive research and further recommendations, the director of the Office of Scholarly Programs prepared a list of candidates for the Librarian's consideration in 2003. In addition to soliciting numerous outside reviews for each of these scholars, the Librarian called upon an expert staff of curators in the Library to conduct extensive biographical and bibliographical research as well as to gather published reviews and discussions of each candidate's work, prepare abstracts of translations of key articles from material available only in foreign languages, and provide a brief characterization and evaluation of the scholarly corpus of the candidate.

Finally, detailed dossiers on each candidate were sent to the members of the Final Kluge Prize Review Panel. Deliberating at the Library, this panel submitted its recommendations to the Librarian, who then made the final decision.

Past winners
Source: Library of Congress 
 2003 – Leszek Kołakowski (Poland)
 2004 – Jaroslav Pelikan (USA) and Paul Ricœur (France)
 2006 – John Hope Franklin and Yu Ying-shih (USA) 
 2008 – Romila Thapar (India) and Peter Brown (Ireland)
 2012 – Fernando Henrique Cardoso (Brazil)
 2015 – Jürgen Habermas (Germany) and Charles Taylor (Canada)
 2018 – Drew Gilpin Faust (USA)
 2020 – Danielle Allen (USA)
 2022 - George Chauncey

See also

 List of general awards in the humanities
 List of philosophy awards
 List of social sciences awards
List of prizes known as the Nobel of a field
List of awards named after people

References

This article incorporates text from the Library of Congress website, which is a product of the US Government and in the public domain.

Awards established in 2002
Humanities awards
Philosophy awards
Social sciences awards
Lifetime achievement awards
2002 establishments in the United States
Library of Congress